is a 2013 film based on the novels of the same name by Hiro Arikawa.

Filming began in October, 2012, and the film was released on April 27, 2013. It was a critical and box office success in Japan, and was followed by a sequel, Library Wars: The Last Mission.

Plot 
The story is set in Japan, in 2019. The Japanese government has a law making it illegal to have objectionable books, and authorizing the military Media Betterment Force to find and destroy blacklisted books.  The libraries oppose this through a paramilitary Library Defense Force. Atsushi Dojo (Junichi Okada) train librarians to protect the libraries from physical attacks.

A young woman named Iku Kasahara (Nana Eikura), who cherishes the childhood memory of a Librarian protecting her choice of books from the MBF, enlists to try out for the Library Defense Force. It is hard going, and Dojo is determined to test her capabilities. Meanwhile the MBF expands their campaigns, testing the balance of power with the Library. Investigating what led to the aggressive campaign leads the team to a conspiracy around an infamous 1999 library massacre. An elaborate battle breaks out between the government and Library Defense forces.

Cast
Junichi Okada
Nana Eikura
Kei Tanaka
Chiaki Kuriyama

References

External links
 

2013 films
Japanese science fiction films
Works by Akiko Nogi
2010s Japanese films